Julie Penner (born 1976) is a Canadian violinist who has played with The FemBots, Broken Social Scene, Do Make Say Think, Hylozoists, The Lowest of the Low and The Weakerthans. She also worked as the music producer for Stuart McLean's The Vinyl Cafe on CBC Radio until it went on hiatus in 2015.

History
Born in Winnipeg, Manitoba, Penner began classical violin lessons as a preschooler. She quickly showed an aptitude for the instrument and continued improving her skills. At the age of 15, she quit playing the violin for a couple of years, but then took it up again to start a band with her friends. Since then, she estimates she has recorded or performed live with more than 40 different groups.

References

External links
 

1976 births
Living people
Musicians from Winnipeg
Canadian indie rock musicians
Canadian rock violinists
Canadian radio producers
Broken Social Scene members
Do Make Say Think members
21st-century Canadian violinists and fiddlers
Canadian women violinists and fiddlers
Women radio producers